National Highway 87 (or NH 87) is a National Highway in southern India. It crosses the Pamban Bridge (Annai Indira Gandhi Bridge) before entering into Pamban Island. The 5 km road between Mukundarayar Chathiram and Dhanuskodi was destroyed during the 1964 cyclone. Then the Government of India has started construction of  the new stretch of road on 2015 and opened to vehicles with some restrictions on Feb'2017 at a cost of ₹ 250 million. At the same time, the road between Madurai and Rameswaram was converted from a two lane road to a four-lane highway. Then Union minister for road transport and shipping Shri.Nitin Gadkari laid the foundation stone for the Rs 1,387-crore project in Madurai on 17 July 2015.
An initial outlay of Rs 927 crore was made {May 2019} and the project has been sanctioned for Rs 1,387 crore. Then the first 75km stretch from Madurai to Paramakudi  was proposed to be converted into a proper four-lane road which is a Green Highway, while the remaining 39km stretch from Paramakudi to Ramanathapuram was widened as a two-lane road with paved shoulders. This road includes bypass from Madurai (Viraganoor Ring road) to Manalur which is a newly constructed route skipping the old route(which runs through Puliyankulam and Silaiman), and has bypasses at several places like Thiruppuvanam, Thiruppachethi, Rajagambiram, Paramakudi (a 9.4-km-long stretch connecting Thelichathanallur and Vendhoni(near kalayur)) and Ramanathapuram (a nine-km-long bypass connecting Achunthanvayal and East Coast Road near Devipattinam) which would substantially ease traffic congestion in these towns and also saves time for those tourists who are going to Rameswaram. Falling under the  Old NH-49, this project is one of the largest completed green corridor in Tamil Nadu by the National Highways Authority of India in the recent times.

Route 
NH38 via Tiruppuvanam, Manamadurai, Paramakudi, Ramanathapuram, Rameswaram, Dhanushkodi.

See also 
 List of National Highways in India (by Highway Number)
 National Highways Development Project

References

External links
 NH 85 on MapsofIndia.com

49
49
National highways in India
Roads in Ernakulam district
Roads in Idukki district
Transport in Rameswaram
Transport in Kochi